The 2013–14 Brown Bears men's basketball team represented Brown University during the 2013–14 NCAA Division I men's basketball season. The Bears, led by second year head coach Mike Martin, played their home games at the Pizzitola Sports Center and were members of the Ivy League. They finished the season 15–14, 7–7 in Ivy League play to finish in fifth place. They were invited to the CollegeInsider.com Tournament (CIT) where they lost in the first round to Holy Cross.

Roster

Schedule

|-
!colspan=9 style="background:#321414; color:#FFFFFF;"| Regular season

|-
!colspan=9 style="background:#321414; color:#FFFFFF;"| CIT

References

Brown Bears men's basketball seasons
Brown
Brown
Brown
Brown